The Dodge Series D5 appeared in October 1936 for the 1937 model year, replacing the previous year's Series D2 (also known as the "Dodge Beauty Winner").

Series D5

The D5 did not differ particularly from its predecessor, continuing to use the same   flathead straight-six engine, single-disc dry-plate clutch, and three-speed manual transmission. A vacuum-operated semi-automatic system was an available option. The body was lightly facelifted, with a modified split grille, larger headlamps, and with the horns moved behind the grille rather than being mounted conspicuously on the fender aprons. A chrome strip continued the length of the car. On the inside, the dashboard had recessed knobs and flush-fitting gauges, as well as safety padding on the front seatbacks and "no-snag" interior door handles. The hypoid rear axle was also new and meant a lower transmission tunnel as well as a flat floor at the rear of the car.

Most D5's sat on the shorter  wheelbase (one inch shorter than in 1936); only the seven-seater Limousine, five-seater Pullman-Limousine, the five-seater Victoria-Convertible models, and the naked chassis used the longer  version. The standard bodyworks were two- and four-door sedans, available as "Fastbacks" or "Touring" sedans, with Touring versions receiving an enclosed luggage compartment. There were two 2-door coupes, the two-seater "Business Coupe" and the "Rumble-Seat Coupe," which had two inside seats and two more in the rumble seat. Convertible versions included the 2-door "Convertible Coupe" and the 4-door "Convertible Sedan."

In October 1937, the D5 was replaced by the Series D8, while the Junior line models (for export and the Canadian market) were badged D9 and D10 for 1938. 295,047 Dodge D5s were built in the calendar year.

A modified copy of the D5's engine was produced under liecense in the Soviet Union by GAZ during the 1940s-1950s and was fitted in the manufacturer's GAZ-M20 Pobeda alongside the GAZ-51 truck.

Dodge Juniors
The so-called Junior line used the Plymouth's chassis, body, and engine, with the grille and other trim parts from Dodge's Senior line. The basic business version (D6) was built in Canada as well as in Detroit, while the deluxe D7 was only built in Canada. The American-made D6s were made for overseas markets and were also available in right-hand drive. Their equipment and bodystyles correspond to Plymouths's P3 and P4 models from the same year, although the  wheelbase is somewhat longer than that of the Plymouth's. Both series were available as a two-door Business Coupe, and as two- or four-door Touring Sedans. The D6 also offered trunkless versions of the sedans while the D7 was available as a Rumble-Seat Coupe.

D6s as well as the D7s received Plymouth's smaller  version of Chrysler's flathead engine, producing  at 3600 rpm. 39 of the D6s built in Detroit received a narrow-bore export engine displacing  to suit local tax designations, developing 19.8 RAC horsepower rather than the larger engine's 23.4 RAC hp. Just over 7,000 D6s were built in Detroit, while 10,888 D6 and D7 were built in Canada, of which over 8,000 were D7s.

References

External links 

D5
Full-size vehicles
Cars introduced in 1936